Edward Clough (14 February 1885 – 19 March 1942) was a British gymnast. He competed in the men's team event at the 1908 Summer Olympics.

References

External links
 

1885 births
1942 deaths
British male artistic gymnasts
Olympic gymnasts of Great Britain
Gymnasts at the 1908 Summer Olympics
Place of birth missing